Poti Municipal Assembly (Georgian: ფოთის საკრებულო) is a representative body in the city of Poti, Georgia. currently consisting of 35 members; of these, 28 are proportional representatives and 7 are elected through single-member districts, representing their constituencies. The council is assembles into session regularly, to consider subject matters such as code changes, utilities, taxes, city budget, oversight of city government and more. Poti sakrebulo is elected every four year. Currently the city council has 5 committees. The last election was held in October 2021. The ruling party of Georgian Dream won the majority of votes.

Composition
The members of the Sakrebulo are selected through a mixed electoral system. Of the 35 seats, 28 are elected by a proportional vote on party lists, while the remaining 7 members are elected through majoritarian single-member districts in the city. The last election was held in October 2021.

City Assembly 2017-2021
The 2017-2021 city council had a total of 25 members. Ruling Georgian Dream had 18 members, United National Movement had two members, and European Georgia, Alliance of Patriots of Georgia, Labour Party, Development Movement and Democratic Movement all had one member each.

Powers

In accordance with the Code of Local Self-Government of the Organic Law of Georgia, the Sakrebulo exercises its powers to define the administrative-territorial organization of the municipality and its identity, organizational activities, determination of the personnel policy of the municipality, regulation and control of the activities of executive bodies; In the fields of municipal property management, social, amenities and household utilities, land use and natural resources us municipal territory planning, transport and road economy, accounting, support for innovative development and informatization.

The authority of the Sakrebulo in the field of administrative-territorial organization of the municipality and defining its identity includes:
 Creation and abolition of administrative units in the municipality, change of their borders
 Establishment of local self-government symbols - coat of arms, flag and other symbols and make changes in them
 establish the rules for the introduction of honorary titles and awards of the self-governing unit and their award
 names of geographical objects, Establishing the rule of numbering of buildings in the settlements
 Making a decision on creating, joining or leaving a non-profit (non-commercial) legal entity together with other self-governing units.
 approval of the socio-economic development strategy of the self-governing unit
 approval of measures and programs to be taken to attract investments and support innovative development in the territory of the municipality

Current committees of assembly

See also 
 Local government in Georgia (country)

References

City assemblies in Georgia (country)
Poti